Mariano Calongje de Leon (born November 18, 1958), known by his stage name Julio Diaz, is a Filipino film and television actor in the Philippines. Diaz is of Filipino Mexican background. He received the Best Actor Gawad Urian Award nomination for his performance in Takaw Tukso (1986).

Career
Julio Diaz's stage name was inspired by the lead character of the 1975 film Manila in the Claws of Light, Julio Madiaga (played by Bembol Roco).

Diaz did movies such as Sinner or Saint (1984) with Claudia Zobel, Paano Tatakasan ang Bukas? (1988) with Dina Bonnevie, Kailan Ka Magiging Akin? (1990) with Janice de Belen, Aliwan Paradise (1992), Bayani (1992), Sakay (1993) with Tetchie Agbayani, The Flor Contemplacion Story (1995) with Nora Aunor, Segurista (1996) with Michelle Aldana, Sana Pag-ibig Na (1998) with Angel Aquino, Hubad Sa Ilalim Ng Buwan (2000) with Klaudia Koronel, Balahibong Pusa (2001) with Rica Peralejo, and Lapu-Lapu (2002) with Lito Lapid.

He also appeared in films like Batanes (2007) with Iza Calzado, Serbis (2008) with Gina Pareño, Kinatay (2009) with Coco Martin, Biyaheng Lupa (2009) with Jacklyn Jose, and 24K (2009).

Awards and nominations
2011 Best Supporting Actor Nominated Gawad Urian Award Blood Ties (2010)
2010 Best Male Performance Nominated YCC Award Soliloquy (2009)
2009 Best Supporting Actor Nominated Gawad Urian Award Service (2008)
1994 Best Actor Nominated FAMAS Award Sakay (1993)
1993 Best Actor Nominated FAMAS Award Bayani (1992)
1993 Best Actor Nominated Gawad Urian Award Bayani (1992)
1987 Best Actor Nominated Gawad Urian Award Takaw Tukso (1986)

Filmography

Film

Television

2015 Juan Tamad (GMA 7)
2015 Dangwa (GMA 7)
2015 Nathaniel
2015 Sabado Badoo (GMA 7)
2015 Pasion De Amor
2015 Inday Bote
2015 Karelasyon (GMA 7)
2015 Marimar
2015 Pare Ko'y
2015 Kailan Ba Tama ang Mali?
2014 Wattpad Presents (TV5)
2014 Magpakailanman
2014 Carmela
2014 The Half Sisters
2014 Illustrado
2014 Innamorata
2013 Wagas (GMA News TV 11)
2013 Katipunan (GMA 7)
2013 Bingit (GMA 7)
2013 It's Showtime: Holy Week Drama Specials (ABS-CBN 2)
2012-2013 Pahiram ng Sandali
2012 Toda Max (ABS-CBN 2)
2011-2012 Munting Heredera
2011-2012 Real Confessions
2012 Maalaala Mo Kaya - Sumpak
2011 Maalaala Mo Kaya - Itak
2011 Spooky Nights Presents (GMA 7)
2011 Buhawi Jack
2011 Babaeng Hampaslupa
2010 Wansapanataym
2010 Ang Yaman ni Lola (GMA 7)
2010 Gumapang Ka sa Lusak
2010 Pilyang Kerubin
2010 Agimat: Mga Alamat ni Ramon Revilla Presents: Elias Paniki (ABS-CBN 2)
2010 Maalaala Mo Kaya - Pera
2009 Precious Hearts Romance (ABS-CBN 2)
2009 Agimat: Mga Alamat ni Ramon Revilla Presents: Tianong Akyat (ABS-CBN 2)
2009 Maalaala Mo Kaya - Sulo
2009 Dapat Ka Bang Mahalin?
2008 Camera Cafe on GMA (GMA 7)
2008 Magpakailanman
2008 Komiks Presents: Kapitan Boom (ABS-CBN 2)
2006 Your Song (ABS-CBN 2)
2006 Baywalk TV Series (QTV 11)
2005 Noel (QTV 11)
2004 Forever In My Heart
2004 Walang Bakas (documentary)
2003 Home Along da Airport (ABS-CBN 2)
2002 Pangako ng Lupa (TV movie)
2001 Idol Ko si Kap (GMA 7)
2001 Eto Na ang Susunod Na Kabanata (ABS-CBN 2)
2000 Super Klenk (GMA 7)
2000 Maynila
2000 CBN Asia Holy Week Drama Special (GMA 7)
1999-2001 Rio Del Mar
1999 Mikee Forever (GMA 7)
1999 Di Ba't Ikaw1998 MTB Lenten Drama Specials1998 Katapat: Mayor Fred Lim (ABS-CBN 2)
1998 Paraiso (RPN 9)
1997-1998 Ikaw Na Sana1997 FLAMES (ABS-CBN 2)
1997 The Calvento Files (ABS-CBN 2)
1996 Mga Liham ni Alberto (TV movie)
1996 1896 (ABC5)
1995-1996 Familia Zaragoza1995 Spotlight Drama Special1995 Mikee (GMA 7)
1995 GMA Telesine Specials1995 Bayani (ABS-CBN 2) - Andrés Bonifacio
1994 Toynk!: Hulog ng Langit (GMA 7)
1994 Noli Me Tángere (ABC5)
1993 Home Along Da Riles (ABS-CBN 2)
1993 Rated Pang Bayan: Pugad Baboy Sa TV (GMA 7) 
1993 Bisperas ng Kasaysayan (RPN 9)
1993 Davao: Ang Gintong Pag-Asa (RPN 9)
1992 Kapag May Katriwan: Ipaglaban Mo! (ABS-CBN 2)
1991 Cebu (RPN 9)
1990 The Maricel Drama Special (ABS-CBN 2)
1990 Boracay (RPN 9)
1989 Stowaway (IBC 13)
1989 Estudyante Blues TV Series (PTV 4)
1988 Eat Bulaga Holy Week Drama Specials (ABS-CBN 2)
1987 Salot: "Sindak" (GMA 7)
1987 Goin Bananas (ABS-CBN 2)
1985 Champoy (RPN 9)
1985 Lovingly Yours1985 Regal Shockers1984 Batibot'' (RPN 9)

References

External links

1958 births
Filipino male film actors
Filipino male television actors
Filipino people of Mexican descent
Ilocano people
Living people
Male actors from Manila